Sedro-Woolley School District No. 101 is a public school district in Sedro-Woolley, Washington, United States. It serves the city of Sedro-Woolley and the communities of Big Lake, Clear Lake, Lyman, Hamilton, in Skagit County.

In May 2021, the district had an enrollment of 4,479 students.

Schools

Elementary schools
 Big Lake Elementary (K-6)
 Central Elementary (K-6)
 Clear Lake Elementary (K-6)
 Evergreen Elementary (K-6)
 Lyman Elementary (K-6)
 Mary Purcell Elementary (K-6)
 Samish Elementary (K-6)

Middle schools
 Cascade Middle School (7-8)

High schools
 State Street High School (9-12)
 Sedro-Woolley High School (9-12)

Alternative programs
 State Street High School
 Sedro-Woolley Special Programs (PK-11)
 Northwest Career and Technical Academy, a skills center operated jointly by several nearby school districts.

Governance
The district is governed by a board of directors elected from geographical sub-districts. Each of the five directors is elected for a term of four years. 

The superintendent is Miriam Mickelson, who has held the position since 2021. The previous superintendent, Phil Brockman, served from 2013 to 2021.

References

External links
Sedro-Woolley School District website
OSPI school district report card

School districts in Washington (state)
Education in Skagit County, Washington